Harold Cook may refer to:

 Harold J. Cook (born 1952), historian of medicine
 Harold Lewis Cook, American poet
 H. Dale Cook (1924–2008), American federal judge

See also
Harold Cooke (1907–1986), British Olympic fencer
Harry Cook (disambiguation)